That's Not Me is an Australian independent comedy film directed by Gregory Erdstein. It was filmed between 2015 and 2016 in Melbourne, Australia, and Los Angeles, US. The screenplay was written by Gregory Erdstein and lead actress Alice Foulcher. That's Not Me had its World Premiere in February 2017 at the Santa Barbara International Film Festival and its Australian Premiere in June 2017 at the Sydney Film Festival. It was released theatrically at selected cinemas across Australia in September 2017. In 2020 That's Not Me was nominated for the AACTA Byron Kennedy Award, as one of the top 12 indie feature films of the past decade.

Synopsis

Polly always dreamed of being a successful actress. The problem is she keeps refusing to take on roles that she finds repugnant. Her identical twin sister Amy will take any role offered to her and because of her work ethics she becomes famous. Because of her sister's fame Polly keeps being mistaken for her.

Envious of her sister's success Polly starts to impersonate her in order to get all the freebies that come along when you're famous.

Polly decides to throw her job in and head for Hollywood for Pilot Season castings. Disappointed that she turned up at the wrong time of year she spends some time catching up with her actress friend Zoe.  Zoe gives Polly a good dose of reality in that all that glitters is not gold.

Cast
 Alice Foulcher as Polly / Amy Cuthbert
 Isabel Lucas as Zoe Cooper
 Richard Davies as Jack Campbell
 Belinda Misevski as Ariel
 Rowan Davie as Oliver Brook
 Andrew S. Gilbert at Stephen Cuthbert
 Catherine Hill as Diane Cuthbert
 Steve Mouzakis as Anthony
 Janine Watson as Patricia Clarke
 Lloyd Allison-Young as Simon
 Andrew O'Keefe as John Davidson
 Christopher Kirby as Cameron
 Benjamin Rigby as Evan (casting director)
 Ming-Zhu Hii as Corrie (director)
 Arthur Angel as Nick (producer)
 Paul Ashcroft as Mars

Reception

Critical response
That's Not Me has been met with positive reviews, and holds a Rotten Tomatoes approval rating of 90%.

Luke Buckmaster of The Guardian gave the film four stars, writing "An outstanding performance from emerging actor Alice Foulcher takes this lean and plucky film about stymied ambition to another level. A young and spunky cast and crew have installed in this smart and sassy dramedy a highly disciplined, tonally cohesive style. It is refreshing to see that kind of storytelling discipline particularly from a first-time film-maker."

Junkee Media called the film "an emotionally resonant and comedic quarter life crisis… It’s a simple set-up delivered endlessly in comedy, but managed so well in That's Not Me that you remember how rare it is that balance is achieved in Australian films." The Sydney Arts Guide praised the film and performances, writing: "There’s not a dud note in That's Not Me thanks to a solid foundation in a script by Alice Foulcher and Gregory Erdstein, and anchored by a winning lead performance by Foulcher and helmed with an assured hand by Erdstein. The support casting is impeccable…Isabel Lucas is ferociously good". Jake Watt of Switch called the film "a marvel of indie ingenuity, with dollops of charm and confident direction." Karl Quinn writing for The Age said the film is "bursting with comedy, humanity and interesting ideas", the Huffington Post called it "a stunning exploration of identity, the industry and the thirst for fame…the perfect blend of comedy and tragedy”, whilst Concrete Playground praised it as "earnest, astute, insightful and thoroughly amusing. This is a movie that is both universal and unmistakably Australian – and that’s just one of many delicate balancing acts that That’s Not Me achieves".

Louise of Urban Cinefile writes that "Foulcher is a knockout. She is unselfconscious and instantly likeable.  Sibling rivalry, celebrity and chasing dreams have never been so much fun in this energetic, uplifting character-driven comedy that soars as surely as the trajectory of its irresistible star”. Time Out gave the film four stars, with critic Nick Dent writing "Alice Foulcher deserves to be a lock for Best Actress [for the 2017 AACTA awards]. [She] conveys low self-esteem with the comedic flair of a Kristin Wiig." Andy Howell of Ain't It Cool writes “[Alice Foulcher] shoulders all the drama and gives one of the best twin performances I’ve ever seen... Having nuanced drama embedded in a comedy is a tightrope walk, but she’s got the skills to land it.” Leigh Paatsch of the Herald Sun gave the film a positive review, noting "a wonderful performance by Foulcher in a deceptively demanding role". Film Alert 101 suggests that Foulcher "may well be the comic talent of her age", and radio station 2ser 107.3 describes her as "absolutely superb throughout".

The film was also flagged by the Santa Barbara Independent as a Must-See Pick of the Santa Barbara International Film Festival, and sold out a number of sessions at the festival.

Accolades
At the 2017 Sydney Film Festival That's Not Me came fourth at the Foxtel Movies Audience Awards and ninth in the Top 10 Audience Awards at the 2017 Melbourne International Film Festival. Alice Foulcher received a Best Actress nomination at the 2018 Australian Film Critics Association awards< for her performance in the film. That's Not Me won the award for Best Film Under $200k at the inaugural 2018 Ozflix Independent Film Awards. The film was ranked #5 of The Guardian's Top 10  Australian Films of 2017. In 2020 That's Not Me was nominated for the AACTA Byron Kennedy Award, as one of the top 12 indie feature films of the past decade.

References

External links
 

2017 films
Australian comedy films
2017 comedy films
2010s English-language films